The Flame (French: La flamme) is a 1926 French silent drama film directed by René Hervil and starring Germaine Rouer, Charles Vanel and Henry Vibart. It was remade as a sound film in 1936.

Cast
 Germaine Rouer as Cloé d'Aubigny  
 Charles Vanel as Boussat  
 Henry Vibart as Lord Sedley  
 Sylviane de Castillo as La mère de Maud  
 Jack Hobbs as Hugues Sedley  
 Colette Darfeuil as Maud  
 Robby Guichard as Hugues Sedley enfant  
 Joe Alex 
 Jean Diéner 
 Octave Berthier
 André Courtal
 Lionel Salem as L'ami d'Hugues

References

Bibliography
 Goble, Alan. The Complete Index to Literary Sources in Film. Walter de Gruyter, 1999.

External links

1926 films
Films directed by René Hervil
French silent feature films
French films based on plays
French black-and-white films
French drama films
1926 drama films
Silent drama films
1920s French films
1920s French-language films